Hugo Gaston and Clément Tabur won the boys' doubles tennis title at the 2018 Australian Open, defeating Rudolf Molleker and Henri Squire in the final, 6–2, 6–2.

Hsu Yu-hsiou and Zhao Lingxi were the defending champions, but Hsu was no longer eligible to participate in junior tournaments and Zhao chose not to participate.

Seeds

Draw

Finals

Top half

Bottom half

References
 Main Draw

Boys' Doubles
2018